Deutschlandhalle was an arena located in the Westend neighbourhood of Berlin, Germany. It was inaugurated on 29 November 1935 by Adolf Hitler. The building was granted landmark status in 1995, but was demolished on 3 December 2011.

History
Built primarily for the 1936 Summer Olympics, the Deutschlandhalle could hold 8,764 people. The Olympic boxing, weightlifting and wrestling competitions took place here. On 19 February 1938 test pilot Hanna Reitsch demonstrated the first indoor flight in the arena with a Focke-Wulf Fw 61 helicopter.

Heavily damaged by air raids in 1943, the Deutschlandhalle was rebuilt after World War II and from 1957 served as a multi purpose arena and sports venue, in the last years primarily for ice hockey, but also for indoor soccer and again for boxing.

After the 1990 German reunification, the Deutschlandhalle lost its position as Berlin's primary arena, replaced by the newly erected Velodrom, Max-Schmeling-Halle and Mercedes-Benz Arena. In 1998 it was closed but in 2001 was reopened again as an ice hockey venue for BSC Preussen, who needed a new home venue after their old venue, Eisstadion an der Jafféstraße, had been demolished. Preussen used it as their home venue until 2009 when it was finally closed.

After the building had to be closed for repairs several times, the Berlin Senate in May 2008 decided to demolish it. Demolition took place on 3 December 2011 with the explosive destruction of the roof.

Events
The arena hosted the 1980 FIBA European Champions Cup final between Maccabi Tel Aviv and Real Madrid, in which Madrid won 89–85, the 1995 FIBA Korać Cup finals in which local Alba Berlin won the trophy, and the 1995 World Amateur Boxing Championships.

The building has also been used for musical events: as part of her À travers l'Europe Tour, in 1959 Dalida had a sold-out concert in front of audience of 9,500. Ella Fitzgerald performed here in 1960; the concert was recorded as Ella in Berlin. On 4 September 1970, it was the site of Jimi Hendrix's penultimate performance.

On 30 November 1980, Queen had performed a concert in the Deutschlandhalle. During the solo of Bohemian Rhapsody (song), Brian accidentally broke a string of his guitar.

The 1981 film Christiane F. shows a performance by David Bowie in the Deutschlandhalle (this scene consists of footage of crowds at an unrelated AC/DC concert in the Deutschlandhalle interspersed with studio scenes featuring Bowie).

References

External links
Deutschlandhalle (German)
Hitler’s mega development – The Deutschlandhalle (English)

Venues of the 1936 Summer Olympics
Olympic boxing venues
Olympic weightlifting venues
Olympic wrestling venues
Indoor arenas in Germany
Basketball venues in Germany
Indoor ice hockey venues in Germany
Nazi architecture
Sports venues in Berlin
Buildings and structures in Charlottenburg-Wilmersdorf
Buildings and structures demolished in 2011
Demolished buildings and structures in Berlin
Boxing venues in Germany
Articles containing video clips
1935 establishments in Germany
Former ice hockey venues
Defunct basketball venues
Defunct indoor arenas